Tomas Dimša (born 2 January 1994) is a Lithuanian professional basketball player for Žalgiris Kaunas of the LKL and the EuroLeague. He mostly plays at the shooting guard position.

Professional career
Before starting his professional career, Dimša played in the NKL with the Žalgiris-Arvydas Sabonis school for four seasons. He won bronze medals during his last two seasons with the Sabonis school team.

On 15 May 2013, Dimša was brought into the main Žalgiris Kaunas roster for a game against Nizhny Novgorod in the VTB United League. According to the new Žalgiris director P. Motiejūnas, Dimša will see more playing time next season. On 19 August 2016, he signed with Vytautas Prienai–Birštonas of Lithuanian Basketball League (LKL), and was a member of the team until contract's termination on 11 April 2018. One day later, he signed with Italian club Pallacanestro Varese of the LBA until the end of the season.

On 27 September 2018, Dimša signed a one-year deal with Juventus Utena of the LKL.

On 29 June 2019, he signed a 1+1 year contract with Lietkabelis Panevėžys. He averaged 14.1 points, 2.7 rebounds and 3.6 assists per game in 2019–20. On 5 June 2020, he signed with Žalgiris Kaunas.

Lithuanian national team
Dimša represented Lithuania in the U–16 and U–19 youth tournaments. He led his team to a silver medal and a bronze medal while participating in two tournaments. In 2014 coach Jonas Kazlauskas included Dimša into preliminary 24 players list for main Lithuania national basketball team.

Dimša won gold medal with the Lithuanian team during the 2017 Summer Universiade after defeating the United States' team 74–85 in the final.

References

External links
 Tomas Dimša at draftexpress.com
 Tomas Dimša at eurobasket.com
 Tomas Dimša at euroleague.net
 Tomas Dimša at RealGM.com

1994 births
Living people
Basketball players from Kaunas
BC Juventus players
BC Lietkabelis players
BC Prienai players
BC Žalgiris players
BC Žalgiris-2 players
CB Gran Canaria players
Liga ACB players
Lithuanian expatriate basketball people in Germany
Lithuanian expatriate basketball people in Italy
Lithuanian expatriate basketball people in Spain
Lithuanian men's basketball players
Medalists at the 2017 Summer Universiade
Pallacanestro Varese players
Shooting guards
Skyliners Frankfurt players
Universo Treviso Basket players
Universiade gold medalists for Lithuania
Universiade medalists in basketball